Thomas Martin (born 1947) is an American historian who is a specialist in the history of the Greco-Roman world. He currently holds the chair "Jeremiah O'Connor" in the Department of Classics at the College of the Holy Cross, where he teaches courses on the Athenian democracy, Hellenism, and the Roman Empire.

Education
Martin earned his B.A. (1970) in Classics summa cum laude from Princeton University and his M.A. (1972) and Ph.D. (1978) in Classical Philology from Harvard University, with graduate work at the American School of Classical Studies at Athens (1973–75).

Work
His research field covers the history of ancient Greece and Rome and numismatics. He is author and co-author of several publications and articles, among which include Sovereignty and Coinage in Classical Greece (Princeton University Press, 1985), Ancient Greece: From Prehistoric to Hellenistic Times (Yale University Press, 1992), The Making of the West: Peoples and Cultures (Bedford/St. Martin's, 2 vol., 2001) and Herodotus and Sima Qian: The First Great Historians of Greece and China (Bedford/St. Martin's, 2009), all reissued. “Ancient Rome: From Romulus to Justinian” (Yale University Press) was published in 2012. He has contributed to the documentaries produced by The History Channel about Roman history, especially to the series Rome: Rise and Fall of an Empire.

References 
College of the Holy Cross: Thomas R. Martin
2003-2004 History Series

External links 
Democracy in the Politics of Aristotle
The Making of the West
Introduction to the Historical Overview in Perseus

21st-century American historians
21st-century American male writers
Harvard University alumni
Princeton University alumni
College of the Holy Cross faculty
Classical philologists
Living people
1947 births
American male non-fiction writers